DeMar (and variants) can be a surname and given name. Notable people with the name include:

Surname
 Anibal de Mar (1908–1980), Cuban radio actor
 Claire Démar (1799–1833), French feminist, journalist and writer
 Clarence DeMar (1888–1958), American marathon runner
 Enoch DeMar (born 1980), American football offensive lineman 
 Gary DeMar, American writer, lecturer, and Christian theologian
 Larry DeMar, video game and pinball designer
 Matyáš Démar (born 1991), Czech volleyball player
 Sébastien Demar (1763–1832), German pianist and composer

Given name
 DeMar DeRozan (born 1989), American basketball player
 Demar Dotson (born 1985), American football offensive tackle
 Demar Phillips (born 1983), Jamaican footballer
 Demar Rose (born 1996), Jamaican footballer
 Demar Stewart (born 1984), Jamaican footballer

See also
 Damar (disambiguation)
 Demarre, given name
 DeMars, surname
 DerMarr Johnson (born 1980), American basketball coach and retired NBA player